Adelomelon brasilianum is a species of sea snail, a marine gastropod mollusk in the family Volutidae, the volutes.

Description
Adelomelon brasilianum produces hundreds of translucent orbs. They are firm to the touch but filled with a thick gelatinous liquid. The eggs might look alien to the eye. Adelomelon brasilianum is located from southern Brazil, through Uruguay to northern Argentina.

References

External links
Image of eggs on beach

Volutidae
Gastropods described in 1811